Amir Farshad Ebrahimi (born August 14, 1975) 
is a former member of Ansar-e Hezbollah.

Ansar-e Hezbollah used violence against students but Ebrahimi  decided, "No, Ansar-e Hezbollah is wrong, you the students are right."

"Confessions"
Ebrahimi appears in a controversial videotape in 2000, apparently confessing to a link between the hardline Iranian political and religious leaders and violent actions of an Iranian group known as Ansar-e Hezbollah.

Ebrahimi had previously held close connections to the members of this group and revealed a number of their inside secrets in the video tape. After the circulation of this tape, human rights lawyer and Nobel Peace Prize winner Shirin Ebadi was accused by an Iranian court to have been involved in making it. She was vindicated and released from prison after a brief period.

Ebrahimi was also sentenced and spent two years in prison.

Identifying paramilitaries

As of 2009 he is identifying members of plain-clothed men who beat up Iranian protesters of the disputed election. Ebrahimi "names and shames those he recognizes on the Web", publishing their names and phone numbers and sometimes even their addresses, "so people in their neighborhood know what they are doing." Some are Ansar-e Hezbollah members and former friends.

Works

On March 27, 2008, wire reports stated that he was in danger of extradition from Turkey to Iran, on charges that he "collaborated with peace activists in the flight of Ali Reza Asgari from Iran."

See also

Ansar-e Hezbollah

References

External links
 His weblog
BBC report of the confession video tape
 His video taped confession transcript
Reaction to and summary of the 2000 tape

Iranian bloggers
Iranian activists
Politicians from Tehran
1975 births
Living people
Ansar-e Hezbollah politicians